MSC Bellissima is a cruise ship operated by MSC Cruises. She was constructed at the Chantiers de l'Atlantique in Saint-Nazaire, France.

The ship joined  in the company's Meraviglia class of cruise ships. The ship debuted in March 2019.

MSC Cruises announced the suspension of all North American itineraries until 30 June 2020 due to the COVID-19 pandemic.

History 
MSC Cruises and STX France cut the first steel of MSC Bellissima on 28 November 2016, with £750M investment. Her keel laying and coin ceremony happened on 15 November 2017. It also features 2,217 cabins and 1,418 balconies that can accommodate 5,686 guests, with the length of 315.8m and a width of 43m. On 14 June 2018, the ship was floated out. Her sea trials took place in December 2018. Andrea Bocelli, alongside his son, performed during the christening of the ship. The ship joined  in the company's Meraviglia class of cruise ships which it has a tonnage of 171,598 GT and a capacity of 4,500 passengers.

Her delivery ceremony took place on 27 February 2019. MSC Bellissima was officially named on 2 March 2019, at Southampton, by the actress Sophia Loren. The original ceremony in a marquee on the quayside had to be abandoned due to high winds, so a substitute ceremony was quickly organised and Loren pressed a button on the ship's bridge to smash the bottle of champagne on the ship's bow.

MSC Cruises collaborated with Harman International to bring "ZOE," the first virtual assistant to be featured on any cruise ship, to MSC Bellissima and future MSC Cruises ships. In September 2019, as a part of MSC Cruises' longstanding relationship with Swarovski, MSC Bellissima featured a suite fully embellished with 700,000 crystals.

On 13 February 2020, MSC Bellissima was featured on Ultimate Mega Cruise Ship on Channel 5 in the United Kingdom.

Route 
MSC Bellissima departed for her maiden voyage on 4 March 2019, and made an inaugural call in Spain on 12 March 2019. She will spend her maiden season in the Mediterranean, before re-positioning to the Persian Gulf in November 2019, cruising from Dubai for the winter season, and made a maiden call at Doha, Qatar in December 2019. She will then be redeployed to Asia to serve MSC's China program in Spring 2020. In 2020, the ship will be heading in Asia, such as China.

Incidents

Coronavirus pandemic 

On 21 March 2020, officials from the Indian state of Telangana reported that a 33-year-old crew member of MSC Bellissima had tested positive for SARS-CoV-2.  The crew member was also reported to have been to Dubai, and was stable at the time of the report.

On 24 March 2020, it was reported that three Azoreans who were former passengers of MSC Bellissima during its cruise to Dubai from 7 March 2020 to 14 March 2020 had tested positive.

On 2 April 2020, a 22-year-old crew member of MSC Bellissima, who had quarantined himself at home in Trappeto, Sicily after returning from Dubai, announced that he had tested positive that day. On 10 April 2020, a dancer from Klagenfurt, Austria, who performed in Cirque du Soleil shows aboard MSC Bellissima, tested positive for the virus while she was still on board the ship. The crew member was tested a day before she was scheduled to leave for home, and the result came as a surprise as she had been asymptomatic. As of 4 May 2020, she has been stuck aboard MSC Bellissima for 50 days.

Notes

References

External links

 MSC Bellissima webpage at MSC Cruises website

Bellissima
Ships built by Chantiers de l'Atlantique
Ships built in France
2018 ships
Cruise ships involved in the COVID-19 pandemic